Syn or SYN may refer to:

In arts and entertainment

In music
The Syn, a band
Synyster Gates, lead guitarist of the band Avenged Sevenfold

Fictional characters
Doctor Syn, in novels by Russell Thorndike

Other uses in arts and entertainment
SYN Media, a youth media organization based in Melbourne, Australia

In science and technology
Syn addition, in organic chemistry
Syn conformation in alkane stereochemistry
Synonym (taxonomy), a system of accepted alternative names for species
SYN (TCP), synchronise packet in transmission control protocol (TCP)
Synchronous idle (␖), one of the C0 and C1 control codes
SYN (OSC), a standardized namespace within Open Sound Control

Other uses
Syn (goddess), in Norse mythology
Coalition of Left, of Movements and Ecology (Synaspismós, abbreviated SYN or ΣΥΝ), a Greek political party